Carlos Agustín Casquero Ruiz (born 14 September 1981 in Sant Boi de Llobregat, Barcelona, Catalonia) is a Spanish retired footballer who played as a defensive midfielder.

External links

1981 births
Living people
People from Baix Llobregat
Sportspeople from the Province of Barcelona
Spanish footballers
Footballers from Catalonia
Association football midfielders
Segunda División players
Segunda División B players
Tercera División players
Real Oviedo Vetusta players
Sporting de Gijón B players
Sporting de Gijón players
Real Jaén footballers
CD Leganés players
Lleida Esportiu footballers
CD Puertollano footballers
Liga I players
ASA 2013 Târgu Mureș players
Spanish expatriate footballers
Expatriate footballers in Romania
Spanish expatriate sportspeople in Romania